Theodor or Theodore Schmidt may refer to:
 Theodor Schmidt (Estonian politician) (1897–?)
 Theodor Schmidt, president of the Austrian Olympic Committee, 1929–1938
 Theodor Schmidt, German sugar refinery owner
  (1908–1986), German physicist and 1964 Nobel Prize nominee
 Theodore Schmidt, character from the TV series "Queer as Folk"
 Theodore H. Schmidt (1904–1982), member of the Pennsylvania State Senate from District 44, 1955–1958